Bassingbourn Village College is an academy school in Bassingbourn, just across the Cambridgeshire border from Royston, Hertfordshire. It currently has around 690 registered full-time students. The college teaches students from Year 7 to Year 11.

The college is divided into four houses: Luther King, Keller, Moore and Shakespeare.

References 

Academies in Cambridgeshire
Secondary schools in Cambridgeshire
Educational institutions established in 1954
South Cambridgeshire District
1954 establishments in England